Major-General Dr. Walter Robert Dornberger (6 September 1895 – 26 June 1980) was a German Army artillery officer whose career spanned World War I and World War II. He was a leader of Nazi Germany's V-2 rocket programme and other projects at the Peenemünde Army Research Centre.

Dornberger was born in Gießen in 1895. In 1914 he enlisted in the German army during World War 1.  In October 1918, as an artillery lieutenant, Dornberger was captured by United States Marines and spent two years in a French prisoner of war camp, mostly in solitary confinement because of repeated escape attempts.  In the late 1920s, Dornberger completed an engineering course with distinction at the Berlin Technical Institute, and in the Spring of 1930, Dornberger graduated after five years with an MS degree in mechanical engineering from the Technische Hochschule Charlottenburg in Berlin.  In 1935, Dornberger received an honorary doctorate, which Col. Karl Emil Becker arranged as Dean of the new Faculty of Military Technology at the TH Berlin.

Rocket development
In April 1930, Dornberger was appointed to the Ballistics Council of the German Army (Reichswehr) Weapons Department as Assistant Examiner to secretly develop a military liquid-fuel rocket suitable for mass-production that would surpass the range of artillery.  In the spring of 1932, Dornberger, his commander (Captain Ritter von Horstig), and Col. Karl Emil Becker visited the Verein für Raumschiffahrt (VfR)'s leased Raketenflugplatz (English: "Rocket Flight Field") and subsequently issued a contract for a demonstration launch.  On 21 December 1932, Captain Dornberger watched a rocket motor explode at Kummersdorf while Wernher von Braun tried to light it with a flaming gasoline can at the end of a  pole.

In 1933, Waffenamt Prüfwesen (Wa Prüf, English: "Weapons Testing") 1/1, under the Heereswaffenamt (Army Weapons Department), commenced work under the direction of Colonel/Dr. Ing. h. c. Dornberger. Dornberger also took over his last military command on 1 October 1934, a powder-rocket training battery at Königsbrück.  In May 1937, Dornberger and his ninety-man organization were transferred from Kummersdorf to Peenemünde.  In September 1942, Dornberger was given two posts:  coordinating the V-1 flying bomb and V-2 rocket development programs and directing active operations.  The first successful test launch of a V-2 was the third test launch on 3 October 1942. In the early morning of 7 July 1943, Dr. Ernst Steinhoff flew von Braun and Major-General Dornberger in his Heinkel He 111 to Hitler's Führerhauptquartier "Wolfsschanze" headquarters and the next day Hitler viewed the film of the successful V-2 test launch (narrated by von Braun) and the scale models of the Watten bunker and launching-troop vehicles:

In January 1944, Dornberger was named Senior Artillery Commander 191 and was headquartered at Maisons-Lafitte near Saint Germain, and in December 1944, Dornberger was given complete authority for anti-aircraft rocket development (Flak E Flugabwehrkanonenentwicklung). On 12 January 1945 on Dornberger's proposal, Albert Speer replaced the Long-Range Weapons Commission with "Working Staff Dornberger".  In February 1945, Dornberger and staff relocated his headquarters from Schwedt-an-der-Oder to Bad Sachsa, then on 6 April 1945, from Bad Sachsa to Haus Ingeborg in Oberjoch near Hindelang in the Allgäu mountains of Bavaria.
Before going to the Alps, General Dornberger hid comprehensive V-2 documentation in a mine near Goslar, which were recovered by the US 332nd Engineer Regiment on 16 May 1945 by a secret action when Goslar was already occupied by the British Army.

On 2 May 1945, Dornberger, von Braun, and five other men departed from Haus Ingeborg and travelled through Gaicht Pass and towards the little Austrian village of Schattwald. They met American soldiers who convoyed the group to the Tyrolean town of Reutte for the night. 
At an internment camp after the war, known as "CSDIC Camp 11", the British bugged Dornberger, who in conversation with Generalmajor Gerhard Bassenge (GOC Air Defences, Tunis & Biserta) said that he and Wernher von Braun had realized in late 1944 that things were going wrong and had consequently communicated with the General Electric Corporation through the German Embassy in Portugal, with the intent coming to some arrangement.

Postwar
In mid-August 1945, after taking part in Operation Backfire, Dornberger was escorted from Cuxhaven to London for interrogation by the British War Crimes Investigation Unit in connection with the use of slave labour in the production of V-2 rockets; he was subsequently transferred and detained for two years at Bridgend in South Wales.

Along with some other German rocket scientists, Dornberger was released and brought to the United States under the auspices of Operation Paperclip and worked for the United States Air Force for three years, developing guided missiles. From 1950 to 1965, he worked for the Bell Aircraft Corporation, where he worked on several projects, rising to the post of Vice-President. He played a major role in the creation of the North American X-15 aircraft and was a key consultant for the Boeing X-20 Dyna-Soar project. He also had a role on the creation of ideas and projects, which, in the end, led to the creation of the Space Shuttle. Dornberger also developed Bell's ASM-A-2, the world's first guided nuclear air-to-surface missile developed for the Strategic Air Command. Dornberger advised West Germany on a European space program. During the 1950s he had some differences with von Braun and was instrumental in recruiting several engineers out of the Huntsville's team for Air Force projects. The most remarkable of them was Krafft Ehricke, who later created the Centaur rocket stage and actively participated in several more Defense projects.

Following retirement, Dornberger went to Mexico and later returned to West Germany, where he died in 1980 in Baden-Württemberg.

Works

Awards and decorations
 Iron Cross (1914), 1st and 2nd Class (World War I)
 Knight Second Class of the House Order of the White Falcon, with Swords (World War I)
 Hesse General Honor Decoration (World War I)
 Wound Badge (1918) in Black (World War I)
 Wehrmacht Long Service Award, 4th to 1st class
 War Merit Cross, 1st and 2nd Class with Swords
 Knights Cross of the War Merit Cross with Swords (29 October 1944)

See also
Arthur Rudolph
List of German inventors and discoverers
Aggregat (rocket family)
V-3 cannon

References

Sources cited
 

 
 ; edition for pagerefs unknown; 1979, 1982, 2003, 2008 editions.

External links

 
 

1895 births
1980 deaths
People from Giessen
People from the Grand Duchy of Hesse
Major generals of the German Army (Wehrmacht)
German aerospace engineers
German spaceflight pioneers
20th-century German physicists
Rocket scientists
NASA people
Research and development in Nazi Germany
Prussian Army personnel
Reichswehr personnel
Recipients of the Knights Cross of the War Merit Cross
Recipients of the Iron Cross (1914), 1st class
Operation Paperclip
Military personnel from Hesse
Engineers from Hesse
German expatriates in the United States
V-weapons people